Tarsozeuzera is a genus of moths in the family Cossidae.

Species
 Tarsozeuzera fuscipars (Hampson, 1892)
 Tarsozeuzera kochi (Semper, 1896-1902)
 Tarsozeuzera livingstoni Yakovlev, 2006
 Tarsozeuzera miklukhomaklayi Yakovlev, 2011
 Tarsozeuzera ustjuzhanini Yakovlev, 2011
 Tarsozeuzera vavizola Yakovlev, 2006

Etymology
The genus name is derived from Greek tarsos (meaning foot) and the genus-name Zeuzera.

References

 , 2004: Cossidae of Thailand. Part 1. (Lepidoptera: Cossidae). Atalanta 35 (3-4): 335-351.
 , 2006, New Cossidae (Lepidoptera) from Asia, Africa and Macronesia, Tinea 19 (3): 188-213.
 , 2013: The Cossidae (Lepidoptera) of Malawi with descriptions of two new species. Zootaxa, 3709 (4): 371-393. Abstract:

External links
Natural History Museum Lepidoptera generic names catalog

Zeuzerinae